Cranbury may refer to:

 Cranbury, New Jersey, a township in Middlesex County, NJ, USA
 Cranbury (CDP), New Jersey, an unincorporated community within the township
 Cranbury Road, the main road in the community
 Cranbury School District, a school board in the township
 Cranbury (Norwalk), a neighborhood in Norwalk, Fairfield County, Connecticut, USA

 Cranbury Brook, a tributary of the Millstone River, in New Jersey, USA

Other uses
 Cranbury Station, New Jersey, an unincorporated community in Cranbury Township, NJ, USA
 Cranbury Park, a country estate and mansion in England, UK

See also
 Cranberry (disambiguation)